Boutin is a surname, and may refer to:

 Anne Boutin (born 1968), French physical chemist and theoretical chemist
 Charles R. Boutin (1942–2021), American politician
 Christine Boutin (born 1944), French politician
 Debra Boutin, American mathematician
 François Boutin (1937–1995), French horse trainer
 Kim Boutin (born 1994), Canadian short track ice skater
 Paul Boutin (born 1961), American journalist
 Paul Boutin (born 1970), French-born American sound engineer
 Rollie Boutin (born 1957), Canadian ice hockey goaltender

French-language surnames